Yhya Hasaba (born January 5, 1974, in Damascus) is a Syrian judoka, who competed in the men's half-heavyweight category. Hasaba qualified as a lone judoka for the Syrian team in the men's half-heavyweight class (100 kg) at the 2004 Summer Olympics in Athens, by granting a tripartite invitation from the International Judo Federation. He lost his opening match to U.S. judoka Rhadi Ferguson, who pulled him off a perfectly timed scoop throw (sukui nage) for an ippon to close the five-minute bout.

References

External links

1974 births
Living people
Syrian male judoka
Olympic judoka of Syria
Judoka at the 2004 Summer Olympics
Sportspeople from Damascus